Ed Bott is an American technology journalist and author, known for his books and articles on Microsoft Windows. While he has over twenty years of experience writing about a variety of tech-related topics and has written for some well-known media outlets, such as PC World and PC/Computing; he has made a name for himself with his renowned pro-Microsoft bias. Bott often applies undisclosed, stricter standards of evaluation to companies he writes about other than Microsoft. He has been the editor for the U.S. version of PC/Computing and the managing editor for PC World in the past. In addition, Bott has written more than 25 books. The topics of his books include Microsoft Windows and Microsoft Office. A few of his works include Windows 7 Inside Out (2009) and Office 2013 Inside Out (2013).
Bott is currently writing for ZDNet.

Awards and honors
Bott is the awardee of eleven Microsoft Most Valuable Professional awards, and, according to Time magazine, had one of the best Twitter feeds of 2013. Bott is also a three-time winner of the Computer Press Association award, won an international award of merit from the Society for Technical Communication, and won two Jesse H. Neal Awards with Woody Leonhard.

Publications
 Windows 10 Inside Out 2nd Edition (November 6, 2016)
 Windows 10 IT Pro Essentials: Support Secrets (July 14, 2016)
 Introducing Windows 10 for IT Professionals (February 18, 2016)
 Windows 10 IT Pro Essentials: Top 10 Tools (April 26, 2016)
 Microsoft Office Inside Out: 2013 Edition (June 25, 2013)
 Introducing Windows 8.1 for IT Professionals (October 15, 2013)
 Windows 7 Inside Out, Deluxe Edition (July 25, 2011)
 Microsoft Office 2010 Inside Out (October 4, 2010)
 Windows 7 Inside Out (September 30, 2009)
 Windows Vista Inside Out, Deluxe Edition 9 (June 8, 2008)
 Windows Vista Inside Out (January 18, 2007)
 Special Edition Using Microsoft Office 2007 (January 1, 2007)
 Microsoft Office 2007 In Depth by Ed Bott (July 24, 2008)
 Microsoft Windows XP Networking and Security Inside Out: Also Covers Windows 2000 (October 5, 2005)
 Microsoft Windows XP Inside Out Deluxe (November 4, 2004)
 Ed Bott's Your New PC: Seven Easy Steps to Help You Get Started! (October 27, 2004)
 Faster Smarter Microsoft Windows XP with Microsoft Plus! Digital Media Edition (November 19, 2003)
 Special Edition Using Microsoft Office 2003 (September 25, 2003)
 Microsoft Windows Security Inside Out for Windows XP and Windows 2000 (January 1, 2002)
 Using Microsoft Office XP Special Edition (May 22, 2001)
 Special Edition Using Microsoft Windows Millennium (November 13, 2000)
 Faster Smarter Microsoft Windows XP (December 13, 2002)
 Practical Microsoft Windows 2000 Professional Practical Series (January 31, 2000)
 Special Edition Using Windows 98 2nd Edition (December 21, 1999)
 Special Edition Using Microsoft Office 2000 (May 17, 1999)
 Using Microsoft Office 2000 Using Series (May 4, 1999)
 Special Edition Using Office 97 With Windows 98 (July 1, 1998)
 Platinum Edition Using Windows 98 (June 1998)
 Using Microsoft Windows 95 With Internet Explorer 4.0 Special Edition (February 1, 1998)
 Using Microsoft Office 97: Platinum Edition (June 7, 1997)
 Using Windows 95 Second Edition (March 1, 1997)
 Using Windows NT Workstation 4.0 (September 1, 1996)
 Using Microsoft Office for Windows 95 (October 1, 1995)
 Using Microsoft Office 4 (January 1, 1995)

Personal life
He has a wife named Judy who lives with him in the U.S. Southwest. The two of them have two English Springer Spaniels, named Mackie and Lucy, who are both rescue dogs.

References

External links

American technology journalists
American male journalists
American technology writers
Living people
Year of birth missing (living people)